Māra Grīva (born 4 August 1989 in Ventspils) is a Latvian track and field athlete competing in the long and triple jump. She won a bronze medal in the triple jump at the 2017 Summer Universiade.

Her coach is her father Māris Grīva - a well-known Latvian coach, whose athlete Dainis Kūla won the Olympic gold medal at the 1980 Moscow Olympic Games. Her sisters Lauma Grīva, Gundega Grīva and brother Janis Svens Grīva are also athletes.

International competitions

Personal bests

Outdoor
Long jump – 6.59 ( Ostrava 2011)
Triple jump – 13.81 (Norman 2011)
Indoor
Triple jump – 13.26 (Lincoln 2014)
Long jump – 6.41 (Nehvizdy 2019)

References 

1989 births
Living people
People from Ventspils
Latvian female long jumpers
Latvian female triple jumpers
Universiade medalists in athletics (track and field)
Universiade bronze medalists for Latvia
Competitors at the 2009 Summer Universiade
Competitors at the 2011 Summer Universiade
Competitors at the 2013 Summer Universiade
Medalists at the 2017 Summer Universiade
University of Nebraska–Lincoln alumni